Dexter Peter (born 9 January 1996) is an English footballer who plays as a centre-back for Bowers & Pitsea.

A product of the Millwall Academy, Peter was released in February 2015, going on to play for Merstham and then Chelmsford City. He joined Colchester United's Academy in June 2016, and made his first-team debut in August 2016. He was released by Colchester in May 2017 and then joined Concord Rangers. In September 2017, he signed for Maldon & Tiptree and in February 2018 signed for Thurrock.

Career
Born in Redbridge, London, Peter progressed through the Academy at Millwall. He was released in February 2015 and went on to represent Isthmian League Premier Division side Merstham in the first half of the 2015–16 season, making eight league appearances. He joined National League South side Chelmsford City in December 2015, where he made four league appearances and one cup appearance during his stint with the Essex club.

Following a trial in the latter stages of the 2015–16 season, Peter signed a one-year contract with Colchester United on 29 June 2016 after impressing for the under-21s. He was named on the bench for Colchester's EFL Trophy tie against Crawley Town on 30 August 2016. He came on to make his first-team debut, replacing Sammie Szmodics after 64-minutes of the 1–0 defeat. He was released by Colchester in May 2017 after the club decided against offering him a new deal.

After his Colchester United release, Peter joined National League South side Concord Rangers. He made his debut on 5 August in their 2–1 defeat at Wealdstone.

Peter made six league appearances for Concord in August. He then left the club to sign for Isthmian League North Division side Maldon & Tiptree, making his debut on 2 September in a 3–3 draw with Hayes & Yeading United in the FA Cup.

He started playing for Isthmian League Premier Division side Thurrock in February 2018.

In August 2018, Peter joined newly promoted Isthmian League Division One North club Coggeshall Town.

In June 2022, Peter joined Bowers & Pitsea.

Career statistics

References

External links

1996 births
Living people
Footballers from the London Borough of Redbridge
Black British sportspeople
English footballers
Association football defenders
Millwall F.C. players
Merstham F.C. players
Chelmsford City F.C. players
Colchester United F.C. players
Concord Rangers F.C. players
Maldon & Tiptree F.C. players
Thurrock F.C. players
Coggeshall Town F.C. players
Grays Athletic F.C. players
Hullbridge Sports F.C. players
Wingate & Finchley F.C. players
Bowers & Pitsea F.C. players
Isthmian League players
National League (English football) players